The Fleming–Watson Historic District comprises 365 buildings and 1 structure of architecture significance on  in Fairmont, West Virginia. It is in two irregular sections separated by a ravine, approximately bounded by Fairmont Avenue, Second and Fay Streets, Apple Crescent, Green and Emerson Streets, Coleman Avenue, Ninth Street, and Outlook. High Gate, the James Edwin Watson House, also listed on the National Register of Historic Places, is located in the district.

The district contains a variety of the architectural styles that were common from 1850 to 1951.  It was listed on the National Register of Historic Places in 2001.

References

Buildings and structures in Marion County, West Virginia
National Register of Historic Places in Marion County, West Virginia
Historic districts in Marion County, West Virginia
Italianate architecture in West Virginia
Romanesque Revival architecture in West Virginia
Historic districts on the National Register of Historic Places in West Virginia